William Price Fox (April 9, 1926 – April 19, 2015) was an American novelist, who wrote Southern Fried and Doctor Golf. Fox has contributed to publications such as Sports Illustrated, the Los Angeles Times, USA Today and Atlantic Monthly.

Early life
William Price Fox was born in Waukegan, Illinois, and lived in South Carolina most of his life. In 2008, he moved to Baltimore, Maryland and then Washington, DC.

Education
Fox dropped out of high school to join the Air Force when the United States was involved in World War II. He lied about his age in order to enroll. After his military service ended, Fox finished the coursework to receive his high school diploma. He later graduated from the University of South Carolina and studied writing under Caroline Gordon.

Professional

Fox taught writing at the famed Iowa Writers' Workshop and was the Writer-In-Residence at the University of South Carolina until 2007.

Journalism
Fox wrote for USA Today, the Atlantic Monthly, Golf Digest, Golf Illustrated, Golf Magazine, Sports Illustrated, The Saturday Evening Post, Millionaire Magazine, American Heritage, the Los Angeles Times, and the Village Voice, as well as countless other publications.

Critical reception
"And then I got into this writer, William Price Fox, who wrote Dixiana Moon and a lot of short stories. He's just great with detail."
Bruce Springsteen, Musician

"The picaresque slapstick of Pitching Tents reminds me of early William Price Fox, where the novelist doesn't seem to be so much writing and plotting as mixing up his own special brew." James Wolcott, Vanity Fair

"If stores had the good taste and decency to separate books by sensibility, [Brett] Butler would fit right next to writers like Lee Smith and William Price Fox, Southerners whose emotions go a mile deep and who remain tough and funny in very dark circumstances." Charles Taylor, Salon

Kurt Vonnegut, Jr (--on Fox's Southern Fried ):

Thank God—at last, a humorist who can make us laugh! What an idea! Bill Fox stands a good chance of capturing the laugh Americans used to give to Mark Twain in simpler times. He's brilliant.

P.G. Wodehouse (--on Fox's Doctor Golf): "It's just the golf book that was needed ... very funny!"

John Updike (--on Fox's Doctor Golf): "Golf in the Kingdom" put me in mind of another curious devotional work, William Price Fox's "Doctor Golf."Doctor Golf, a fanatic even quainter and keener than Shivas Irons, runs a thirty-nine-member golf sanctuary in Arkansas called Eagle-Ho, refers to "young Hagen," advocates caddy flogging, sells by mail order a clanking, cumbersome line of golf paraphernalia, and conducts a large correspondence. When one correspondent writes,"I am in my 65th year and I have been seized by golflike a mouse in the claws of a golden eagle,"Doctor Golf congratulates him:

Walt Kelly (creator of Pogo-- on Fox's Moonshine Light/Moonshine Bright): "He has put down a modern generation of gasoline crazy kids in its true, bittersweet, hilarious best and, thank God, worst ... As we understand the 1850s ... because of a couple of histories of boys written by a fellow named Twain, so here can we get a slippery eyeball on the speed boys of today ... these boys are universal ... these are southerners who are very boy."

Richard Yates (on Fox's Ruby Red): "William Price Fox is a natural-- and better still, he's an original ... the story is wholly alive and couldn't have been brought to life by anyone else. I think it's a beautiful piece of work."

Writer's Workshop Series for P.B.S.
Fox organized and hosted the Writer's Workshop series on PBS, featuring interviews and workshops with these famous writers:
 James Dickey
 Nora Ephron
 John Gardner
 John Hawkes
 John Irving
 Pauline Kael
 James Alan McPherson
 George Plimpton
 Reynolds Price
 Susan Sontag
 Stephen Spender
 William Styron
 Kurt Vonnegut
 Tom Wolfe

Personal life
Bill was married to novelist/artist Sarah Gilbert (Fox). They have one daughter named Jenkins.  He had a son, Colin, and a daughter, Kathy, from  previous marriages. He died on April 19, 2015, ten days after his 89th birthday.

Bibliography
 Southern Fried
 Southern Fried Plus Six
 Moonshine Light, Moonshine Bright
 Ruby Red
 Dixiana Moon
 Chitlin Strut and Other Madrigals
 Hurricane Hugo: Storm of the Century
 Golfing in the Carolinas
 South Carolina: Off The Beaten Path
 Doctor Golf
 Satchel Paige's America (voted as one of the best books of 2007 by The Library Journal)
 Wild Blue Yonder

Notes

William Price Fox - New York Times obituary

External links
William Price Fox, Jr. collection at the University of South Carolina
William Price Fox's novelist wife: Sarah Gilbert (Fox)

1926 births
2015 deaths
Iowa Writers' Workshop faculty
People from Waukegan, Illinois
Writers from Baltimore
University of South Carolina alumni
Novelists from South Carolina
American male novelists
Novelists from Illinois
American male journalists
20th-century American novelists
21st-century American novelists
Journalists from Illinois
20th-century American male writers
21st-century American male writers
Novelists from Maryland
Novelists from Iowa
20th-century American non-fiction writers
21st-century American non-fiction writers